A selenate selenite is a chemical compound or salt that contains selenite and selenate anions (SeO32- and SeO42-). These are mixed anion compounds. Some have third anions.

Naming 
A selenate selenite compound may also be called a selenite selenate.

Production 
One way to produce a selenate selenite compound is to evaporate a water solution of selenate and selenite compounds.

Properties 
On heating, selenate selenites lose SeO2 and O2 and yield selenites, and ultimately metal oxides.

Related 
Related to these are the sulfate sulfites and tellurate tellurites. They can be classed as mixed valent compounds.

List

References

Selenates
Selenites
Mixed anion compounds